The 1893–94 Oregon Agricultural Aggies football team represented Oregon Agricultural College during the 1893 college football season. It was the school's inaugural football season. The team played a total of six games, finishing with a 5–1 record, and were regarded as the best collegiate team in Oregon for the season.

Schedule

Game summaries

Game 1: vs. Albany College
November 11, 1893 marked the date of the first game of football played on the grounds of Oregon Agricultural College or in Benton County, Oregon itself, when the OAC Aggies met a rival squad fielded by their neighbors of Albany College.

The Albany team arrived in Corvallis at 11 am on game day and were conducted to Cauthorn Hall on the OAC campus for photographs and a team meal. The grounds were crowded with fans, with more than 500 people paying 10 cents each to attend. The game was reckoned as the largest crowd to ever view a sporting event in Corvallis.

The game began at 2 pm, with Albany receiving the ball but quickly losing possession, followed by the first touchdown, scored by halfback Brady Burnett after only four minutes had been played. The game that followed proved to be a rout, with the Aggies posting a 42-0 lead at halftime. The Albany squad was so demoralized by the drubbing that three players would not take the field in the second half, with these non-participants replaced by OAC substitute players for the duration of the game. The final score in the contest was 64-0.

Despite the outcome, the Albany team held no ill-will towards their gridiron betters, with one individual close to the Albany team opining in the local press:

"The football team was well treated, with all the word implies. The Agricultural fellows showed every courtesy and bent every energy to make our stay in their city pleasant and profitable. Fairness in the game and gentility elsewhere must be placed to the credit of the young men of Corvallis."

Game 2: at Oregon State Normal School

The Aggies extended their record to 2-0 with a victory on Friday, November 17, 1893 over Oregon State Normal School, playing in bad weather before a scant crowd of about 300 fans in Monmouth, Oregon. Right halfback Brady Burnett was again the most effective offensive weapon for the Aggies as he ran the ball effectively behind the stout right side of the offensive line, with one observer noting that OAC "outplayed their opponents in every particular" by making use of "scientific playing" while the Monmouths "relied upon their muscle."

OSNS ran the ball effectively behind a "rolling wedge," with their halfbacks Bilyeu and Brodie both credited with outstanding games rushing the football. An early OAC score and conversion was answered by Monmouth's Bilyeu, who scored a four-point touchdown, with the subsequent kick for two-points after touchdown failing to leave the score OAC 6, OSNS 4. The teams traded scores with the score standing Aggies 18, Monmouths 10 as the 45-minute first half came to a close.

A ten-minute intermission followed, with the spectators spending their time cheering and blowing horns in anticipation of second half action.

Monmouth received the ball to open the second half and drove it the length of the field in six minutes, scoring a 4-point touchdown and 2-point conversion kick to cut the Aggies' lead to 18-16. The Monmouth team could not hold, however, with the Aggies quickly answering with a Brady Burnett run around end to score his fourth touchdown of the day, extending the lead to 24-16. Yet another Burnett touchdown followed, a 100-yard run coming on a reverse play in which his backfield mate Nash ran the ball one way before handing it off to Burnett, who streaked around end in the other direction. 

Following another OSNS touchdown to make the score 30-22, Captain Brady Burnett scored an astounding sixth touchdown for the Aggies to cap the scoring at 36-22, with his score coming at the 34 minute mark of the second half.

Following the game the two teams shared a meal at the OSNS dining hall.

Game 3: vs. Oregon State Normal School

Four weeks after their resounding victory at Monmouth, Oregon Agricultural College and Oregon State Normal School met in Corvallis for a rematch. The game, poorly documented in the local press, was won 28-0 by the home team Aggies.

The game would be the last of Fall term at the college, with OAC finishing at the top of the "Oregon League" standings with a record of 3-0. Pacific University, the other Oregon school playing football in 1893, hit the break with a record of 2-0, while Monmouth closed at 0-4. The Albany program was wrecked by their initial disaster in Corvallis, tapping out of further action at the break with a record of 0-1.

Game 4: vs. Multnomah Athletic Club second team

Early in January 1894, the Aggies football team received a challenge from the Multnomah Athletic Club "Juniors" (second team). A game was hastily scheduled for Friday, January 19, with the actual date contest later moved back one day to Saturday, January 20. As the home team, the Aggies were responsible for the traveling expenses of the Portland squad, with a sum of $100 agreed upon. Of this amount, a collection from professors of the school raised $30, with the remaining $70 to be generated by gate receipts.

The Multnomah Athletic Club arrived at 1 pm on game day aboard a special Oregon Pacific Railroad train sent down from Portland. The team was received at the station and taken to a dormitory where they were served lunch. Both teams entered the muddy field at 2:45 pm to begin the contest, which ultimately kicked off at 2:52 pm. 

Neither team could move the ball in the first half, with the Aggies gaining the best opportunity when they took over the ball on the Multnomahs' 20 yard line after the visitors turned over the ball on downs. As the Aggies drove toward the end zone, fullback R.W. Terrell fumbled the ball. Multnomah Athletic recovered but were driven into their own end zone for a two-point safety, with Aggie quarterback Will Bloss making the tackle. So the score stood at the end of the 30-minute first half: Oregon Agricultural College 2, Multnomah Athletic Club Juniors 0.

The OAC college band and the Telescope String Band of Albany entertained the crowd during the intermission, with horns and other noisemakers in evidence in the crowd.

During the second half the Aggies received the ball and drove down the field, with quarterback Will Bloss popping one run for a twenty yard gain. Mixing their runs left, right, and center, the Aggies pushed the ball to the five yard line, which provided an opportunity for Captain Burnett to score the only touchdown of the game. The four points made the score 6-0, but Aggie kicker Desborough's effort for two points after touchdown sailed wide of the goalposts, keeping the Multnomahs in a one-score game.

Either side could move the ball against the other for the rest of the game, with Multnomah Athletic Club running out of time at the end of the game with the ball on the Aggies' fifteen yard line. Every courtesy had been allowed — the half had already been extended eight minutes to give the visitors a chance to score. Four Aggie players — Bloss, Burnett, Nash, and Small — played every play of the entire 60-minute game.

Game 5: vs. Covallis Athletic Association

Fresh off their victory over the Multnomah Athletic Club junior team, on January 23 team manager Will Bloss announced that he was in receipt of a letter from the Multnomah Athletic Club senior team accepting the Aggies' challenge to play a game. The game between the Aggies and the Multnomah AC first team was tentatively scheduled for February 3. It was additionally announced that local football fans had raised $200 to purchase a silver trophy to award the OAC team for having won the state championship of the 1893-94 season. Tiffany of New York was contracted for the manufacture of the honorary silver cup.

Time proved to be too short to organize such a major event, however, so instead OAC did battle on February 3 against a newly  organized team of young Corvallis men who were not affiliated with the college. Between two and three hundred people were in attendance to see the Aggies rout the upstart Corvallis team by a score of 36-0. About $20 was raised at the gate — money which was used to enclose the field in wire to keep back overwrought spectators who had crowded the field during previous contests.

Game 6: at Portland University

The final game of the 1893-94 football season took place on February 24, 1894 on the road against Portland University, a fledgling Methodist private college started in 1891 following a split from Willamette University. Going into the game with a record of 5 wins and no losses, the OAC team and their backers were brimming with confidence over the prospect of an easy victory against an over-matched foe. OAC's focus was on bigger fish, a challenge having been issued to play Stanford University in the spring, with a local judge offering the Aggie team a $500 cash prize for a victory over their California counterparts. Overconfident and lacking focus, the team walked into the first "trap game" in school history, suffering a stunning loss in stumptown, falling 26-12.

The anticipated road game against Stanford never materialized and Oregon Agricultural College finished their inaugural season with a record of 5 wins and 1 defeat.

Roster

The starting 11 for the November 11, 1893, debut of collegiate football at OAC were:

 Charles Owsley, left end 
 John Fulton, left tackle 
 F. Gorrell, left guard 
 Harvey "Pap Hayseed" McAllister, center 
 Henry M. Desborough, right guard (and kicker)
 Mark "Clyde" Phillips, right tackle 
 Charles Small, right end 

 Will H. Bloss, quarterback
 Percival Nash, left halfback 
 Brady F. Burnett, right halfback (Captain)
 Ralph W. Terrell, fullback

(Note: Players played both offensively and defensively in this era, as with soccer, rugby, or basketball.)

Starting in game two was:

 C. Chandler, left tackle

with additional reserves:

 Thomas Beall
 Arthur E. Buchanan
 Daniel H. Bodine
 E.G. Emmett
 A.D. Nash

References

Oregon Agricultural
Oregon State Beavers football seasons
Oregon Agricultural Aggies football
Oregon Agricultural Aggies football